Esporte Clube Aracruz, commonly known as Aracruz, is a Brazilian football club based in Aracruz, Espírito Santo state. The club was formerly known as Esporte Clube Sauassu. They won the Campeonato Capixaba once.

History
The club was founded on June 12, 1954, as Esporte Clube Sauassu. They won the Campeonato Capixaba Second Level in 1990 and in 2010. Aracruz won the Campeonato Capixaba in 2012, after beating Conilon in the final.

Achievements

 Campeonato Capixaba:
 Winners (1): 2012
 Campeonato Capixaba Second Level:
 Winners (2): 1990, 2010

Stadium
Esporte Clube Aracruz play their home games at Estádio Eugênio Antônio Bitti. The stadium has a maximum capacity of 5,000 people.

References

Association football clubs established in 1954
Football clubs in Espírito Santo
1954 establishments in Brazil